The Complete Bud Powell on Verve is a five-disc box set, released on September 27, 1994 by Verve Records, containing all of jazz pianist Bud Powell's recordings as leader for producer Norman Granz.

Track listing
All songs were written by Bud Powell, except where noted.

Disc one
"Tempus Fugue-it" (aka "Tempus Fugit") – 2:25
"Celia" – 2:57
"Cherokee" (Ray Noble) – 3:37
"I'll Keep Loving You" – 2:40
"Strictly Confidential" – 3:08
"All God's Chillun Got Rhythm" (Bronislaw Kaper, Gus Kahn, Walter Jurmann) – 2:59
"So Sorry, Please" – 3:14
"Get Happy" (Harold Arlen, Ted Koehler) – 2:51
"Sometimes I'm Happy" (Vincent Youmans, Irving Caesar) – 3:36
"Sweet Georgia Brown" (Maceo Pinkard, Kenneth Casey) – 2:48
"Yesterdays" (Jerome Kern, Otto Harbach) – 2:49
"April in Paris" (Vernon Duke, E.Y. "Yip" Harburg) – 3:08
"Body and Soul" (Johnny Green, Edward Heyman, Robert Sour, Frank Eyton) – 3:20
"Hallelujah!" (Youmans, Leo Robin, Clifford Grey) – 2:58
"Tea for Two" [compilation take (take 6)] (Youmans, Caesar) – 4:13
"Tea for Two" [common take (take 5)] (Youmans, Caesar) – 3:29
"Tea for Two" [78 take (take 10)] (Youmans, Caesar) – 3:46
"Parisian Thoroughfare" (aka "Parisienne Thorofare") – 2:28
"Oblivion" – 2:08
"Dusk in Sandi" (aka "Dusky 'n' Sandy") – 2:13
"Hallucinations" (aka "Budo") – 2:25
"The Fruit" – 3:16
"A Nightingale Sang in Berkeley Square" (Manning Sherwin, Jack Strachey, Eric Maschwitz) – 3:41
"Just One of Those Things" (Cole Porter) – 3:50
"The Last Time I Saw Paris" (Kern, Oscar Hammerstein II) – 3:18

Disc two
"Moonlight in Vermont" (Karl Suessdorf, John Blackburn) – 3:35
"Spring Is Here" (Richard Rodgers, Lorenz Hart) – 3:27
"Buttercup" – 2:59
"Fantasy in Blue" – 3:04
"It Never Entered My Mind" (Rodgers, Hart) – 2:56
"A Foggy Day" (George Gershwin, Ira Gershwin) – 3:45
"Time Was" (aka "Duerme" «Sleep») (Miguel Prado, Gabriel Luna, Bob Russell) – 4:17
"My Funny Valentine" (Rodgers, Hart) – 2:53
"Like Someone in Love" [incomplete] (Jimmy Van Heusen, Johnny Burke) – 1:39
"Like Someone in Love" (Van Heusen, Burke) – 2:00
"Deep Night" (Charles E. Henderson, Rudy Vallée) – 3:45
"That Old Black Magic" [incomplete] (Harold Arlen, Johnny Mercer) – 0:55
"That Old Black Magic [alternate take 1] (Arlen, Mercer) – 2:27
"That Old Black Magic (Arlen, Mercer) – 2:21
"That Old Black Magic [alternate take 2] (Arlen, Mercer) – 2:54
"'Round Midnight" (Thelonious Monk) – 5:08

Disc three
"Thou Swell" [alternate take] (Richard Rodgers, Lorenz Hart) – 4:06
"Thou Swell" (Rodgers, Hart) – 4:29
"Someone to Watch Over Me" (George Gershwin, Ira Gershwin) – 2:33
"Bean and the Boys" (contrafact of "Lover Come Back to Me") (Coleman Hawkins) – 3:36
"Tenderly" [incomplete] (Walter Gross, Jack Lawrence) – 0:23
"Tenderly" (Gross, Lawrence) – 3:20
"How High the Moon" (Morgan Lewis, Nancy Hamilton) – 4:23
"I Get a Kick out of You" [incomplete] (Cole Porter) – 0:35
"I Get a Kick out of You" (Porter) – 4:26
"I Get a Kick out of You" [alternate take] (Porter) – 3:58
"The Best Thing for You (Would Be Me)" [incomplete] (Irving Berlin) – 1:29
"You Go to My Head" (J. Fred Coots, Haven Gillespie) – 4:11
"The Best Thing for You (Would Be Me)" (aka "The Best") (Berlin) – 2:41
"Mediocre" – 2:55
"All the Things You Are" (Jerome Kern, Oscar Hammerstein II) – 3:30
"Epistrophy" (Thelonious Monk, Kenny Clarke) – 3:00
"Dance of the Infidels" – 2:16
"Salt Peanuts" (Dizzy Gillespie, Clarke) – 2:19
"Hey George" (aka "Sweet Georgia Brown") (Maceo Pinkard, Kenneth Casey) – 3:25

Disc four
"Conception" [incomplete] (George Shearing) – 0:09
"Conception" (Shearing) – 3:45
"Bean and the Boys" [incomplete] (Coleman Hawkins) – 0:28
"Bean and the Boys" (Hawkins) – 4:04
"Heart and Soul" (Hoagy Carmichael, Frank Loesser) – 2:52
"Heart and Soul" [alternate take 1] (Carmichael, Loesser) – 2:31
"Heart and Soul" [alternate take 2] (Carmichael, Loesser) – 3:22
"Willow Grove" (aka "Willow Groove") [alternate take] – 3:17
"Willow Grove" (aka "Willow Groove") – 4:27
"Crazy Rhythm" (Joseph Meyer, Roger Wolfe Kahn, Irving Caesar) – 3:32
"Willow Weep for Me" (Ann Ronnell) – 4:40
"Bean and the Boys" (Hawkins) – 5:24
"East of the Sun (and West of the Moon)" [alternate take] (Brooks Bowman) – 3:48
"East of the Sun (and West of the Moon)" [incomplete] (Bowman) – 0:30
"East of the Sun (and West of the Moon)" (Bowman) – 3:58
"Lady Bird" [alternate take 1] (Tadd Dameron) – 3:11
"Lady Bird" [incomplete] (Dameron) – 0:18
"Lady Bird" [alternate take 2] (Dameron) – 3:38
"Stairway to the Stars" [incomplete] (Matty Malneck, Frank Signorelli, Mitchell Parish) – 0:05
"Stairway to the Stars" (Malneck, Signorelli, Parish) – 5:01
"Lady Bird" (Dameron) – 4:44

Disc five
"Lullaby in Rhythm" [incomplete] (Clarence Profit, Edgar Sampson, Benny Goodman, Walter Hirsch) – 0:28
"Lullaby in Rhythm" (Profit, Sampson, Goodman, Hirsch) – 4:00
"Star Eyes" [alternate take 1] (Gene De Paul, Don Raye) – 3:18
"Star Eyes" [alternate take 2] (De Paul, Raye) – 3:14
"Star Eyes" [alternate take 3] (De Paul, Raye) – 3:52
"Star Eyes" [incomplete] (De Paul, Raye) – 0:29
"Star Eyes" [alternate take 4] (De Paul, Raye) – 3:54
"Star Eyes" (De Paul, Raye) – 3:31
"Confirmation" (Charlie Parker) – 4:21
"When I Fall in Love" (Victor Young, Edward Heyman) – 1:39
"My Heart Stood Still" (Richard Rodgers, Lorenz Hart) – 3:29
"Blues in the Closet" (aka "Collard Greens and Black Eyed Peas") (Harry Babasin, Oscar Pettiford) – 3:01
"Swingin' Till the Girls Come Home" (Pettiford) – 3:21
"I Know That You Know" (Vincent Youmans, Anne Caldwell) – 2:23
"Elegy" (aka "Elegie" and "Elogie") – 2:56
"Woody 'n' You" (Dizzy Gillespie) – 3:52
"I Should Care" (Sammy Cahn, Axel Stordahl, Paul Weston) – 3:38
"Now's the Time" (Charlie Parker) – 4:32
"I Didn't Know What Time It Was" (Rodgers, Hart) – 3:58
"Be-Bop" (Gillespie) – 2:23
"52nd Street Theme" (Thelonious Monk) – 2:23

Personnel

Performance
Bud Powell plays piano on all tracks.

February 23, 1949, disc 1, tracks 1-6. See Jazz Giant.
Ray Brown – bass (except track 4 – Powell solo)
Max Roach – drums (except track 4 – Powell solo)
February 1950, disc 1, tracks 7-13. See Jazz Giant.
Curly Russell – bass (except track 11 – Powell solo)
Max Roach – drums (except track 11 – Powell solo)
July 1, 1950, disc 1, tracks 14-17. See The Genius of Bud Powell.
Ray Brown – bass
Buddy Rich - drums
February 1951, disc 1, tracks 18-25 – Powell solos. See The Genius of Bud Powell.

June 2, 1954, disc 2, tracks 1-4. See Bud Powell's Moods.
George Duvivier – bass
Art Taylor - drums
June 4, 1954, disc 2, tracks 5-8. See Bud Powell's Moods.
Percy Heath – bass
Art Taylor - drums
December 16, 1954, disc 2, tracks 9-16. See Jazz Original.
Percy Heath – bass (except track 10 – Powell solo)
Max Roach - drums (except tracks 9-10)
January 11, 1955, disc 3, tracks 1-6. January 12, 1955, disc 3, tracks 7-13. See Jazz Original and Bud Powell's Moods.
Lloyd Trotman – bass
Art Blakey - drums
January 13, 1955, disc 3, tracks 14-19. See The Lonely One....
Percy Heath – bass
Kenny Clarke - drums
April 25, 1955, disc 4, tracks 1-11. April 27, 1955, disc 4, tracks 12-21 and disc 5, tracks 1-9. See Piano Interpretations and The Lonely One....
George Duvivier – bass
Art Taylor - drums
September 13, 1956, disc 5, tracks 10-21. See Blues in the Closet.
Ray Brown – bass
Osie Johnson - drums

Production
Norman Granz – producer
Peter Pullman – liner notes
David Lau, Lisa Po-Ying Huang - Graphic Design

References

Bud Powell compilation albums
1994 compilation albums
Verve Records compilation albums